Statistics of Emperor's Cup in the 1922 season.

Overview
It was contested by four teams, and Nagoya Shukyu-dan won the championship. The winning team consisted of graduates of Meirin High School and students of, among others, Aichi Daiichi Teachers College and Shiga Teachers College.

Results

Semifinals
Nagoya Shukyu-dan 2–1 Osaka S.C.
Hiroshima Koto-shihan 3–1 Astra Club

Final

Nagoya Shukyu-dan 1–0 Hiroshima Koto-shihan
Nagoya Shukyu-dan won the championship.

References

 NHK

Emperor's Cup
1922 in Japanese football